The 1998 City of Imola motorcycle Grand Prix was the eleventh round of the 1998 Grand Prix motorcycle racing season. It took place on 6 September 1998 at Imola.

500 cc classification

250 cc classification

125 cc classification

Championship standings after the race (500cc)

Below are the standings for the top five riders and constructors after round eleven has concluded. 

Riders' Championship standings

Constructors' Championship standings

 Note: Only the top five positions are included for both sets of standings.

References

City of Imola motorcycle Grand Prix
City of Imola
City of Imola Motorcycle Grand Prix